Tephritis sahandi is a species of tephritid or fruit flies in the genus Tephritis of the family Tephritidae.

Distribution
Iran.

References

Tephritinae
Insects described in 2011
Diptera of Asia